Lodestar is the seventh studio album by the English folk musician, Shirley Collins. The album is Collins's first in 38 years, making it one of the longest gaps between studio albums.

Background
After being one of the most significant figures in the English Folk Revival of the 1960s, Collins withdrew from music in the late 1970s when she developed dysphonia, attributed to being left by her second husband, Ashley Hutchings.  In 2014 she was coaxed back into performance by Current 93's David Tibet for a concert at Union Chapel in North London. Following this performance, Collins started making a new album at her house in Lewes, recorded by Stephen Thrower and Ossian Brown of the group Cyclobe. Some of the album's recording was filmed, and included in the documentary The Ballad of Shirley Collins.

Reception
Lodestar received widespread acclaim from music critics. At Metacritic, the album received an average score of 81, which indicates "universal acclaim", based on 9 reviews.

Accolades

References

2016 albums
Shirley Collins albums